Berga Esporte Clube, commonly known as Berga, was a Brazilian football club based in Cuiabá, Mato Grosso state.

History
The club was founded on April 13, 1983, as Treze Esporte Clube, it was renamed to Berga Esporte Clube on April 1, 1999, after the club was bought by businessman Ettore Bergamaschi. The club folded in 2005, after he died.

Stadium

Berga Esporte Clube played their home games at Verdão. The stadium has a maximum capacity of 40,000 people.

References

Association football clubs established in 1983
Association football clubs disestablished in 2005
Defunct football clubs in Mato Grosso
1983 establishments in Brazil
2005 disestablishments in Brazil